Roelof Kranenburg (Groningen, 8 September 1880 – The Hague, 27 December 1956) was a Dutch politician, lawyer and professor of constitutional law.
Initially, he was a member of the Vrijzinnig Democratische Bond, but later he joined the PvdA. He was  president of the Senate from 1946 till 1951 He was preceded by Willem Lodewijk de Vos van Steenwijk and was succeeded by his party colleague Jan Anne Jonkman.
During the Second World War, he was  put under arrest by the Nazis.

Decorations
: Knight Grand Cross of the Order of the Netherlands Lion

References

1880 births
1956 deaths
Politicians from Groningen (city)
Free-thinking Democratic League politicians
Labour Party (Netherlands) politicians
Presidents of the Senate (Netherlands)
Members of the Senate (Netherlands)